"Allô, allô" ("Hello, Hello") is a 2005 song recorded by French singer Ilona. It was the fifth and last single from her debut album Un Monde Parfait and was released in the first days of April 2006. It had much less success than the previous four singles, but it managed to reach the top ten in France.

Lyrics and music
The lyrics were written and the music composed by Laurent Jeanne, Dan Mitrecey, Philippe Pelet and Olivier Perrot. The song is about the social networking opportunities and convenience brought to the singer's life by her mobile telephone. In the song, Ilona enumerates eight first names of girls who apparently are her friends. However, in an interview, Ilona said that the song is not autobiographical and that she doesn't know girls with such first names.

Chart performances
In France, "Allô, allô" entered the singles chart at #11 on April 8, 2006, then peaked at #10 for two successive weeks. It almost kept on dropping on the chart, totalling 12 weeks in the top 50 and 21 weeks on the chart (top 100). It allowed Ilona to obtain her fifth top ten hit from an album, which was quite rare in France. "Allô, allô" was the 79th best-selling single of 2006 in France.

In Belgium (Wallonia), the single was low charted, peaking at #35 for two weeks (on May 6 and June 3, 2006) and staying in the top 40 for four weeks.

Track listings
 CD single - France

 Digital download

Credits and personnel

 Composers: Laurent Jeanne, Dan Mitrecey, Philippe Pelet and Olivier Perrot
 Editions: Moneypenny, Atello and Universal Music Italia
 Production: Ivan Russo, Laurent Jeanne, Philippe Pelet, Dan Mitrecey, Olivier Perrot
 Vocals: Ilona
 Background vocals: "The Ilonettes": Lena Nester, Rokhya-Lucie Dieng, Sophie Lemoine
 Additionnel background vocals: Noémie Brosset, Maïlis Mitrecey
 Vocal box: Roxane Perrot
 Synths: Philippe Pelet, Ivan Russo

 Additionnel production: Ivan Russo & Domydee at Atollorecording Studio (Naples)
 Executive production: Gilles Caballero and Roxane Perrot
 Voices recording: Philippe Vandenhende at Moneypenny Studio (Paris) with Franck Benhamou and Benoît Cinquin, and at Ty-Houarn Studio (Préfailles) with Gilles Caballero
 Mixing: Ivan Russo at Atollorecording Studio (Naples)
 Remixed by Laurent Pautrat (Clap Production / Pool e Music) for Scorpio Music

Charts

References

2005 songs
2006 singles
Ilona Mitrecey songs